Haouch Er Rafqa    is  a Lebanese local authority  in the  Baalbek District in Baalbek-Hermel Governorate.

History
In 1838, Eli Smith noted  Haush er-Rafika  as a Metawileh village in the Baalbek area.

References

Bibliography

External links
Haouch Er Rafqa,  Localiban

Populated places in Baalbek District
Shia Muslim communities in Lebanon